Fernando Gomes de Jesus, or simply Fernando (born May 12, 1986 in Rio de Janeiro), is a Brazilian defensive midfielder. He currently plays for Volta Redonda.

Fernando is the half-brother of Carlos Alberto.

Career

Flamengo
On January 8, 2010 Fernando signed with Flamengo.

Flamengo career statistics
(Correct )

according to combined sources on the Flamengo official website and Flaestatística.

Honours
 São Paulo
Brazilian Série A: 2007
 Flamengo
Taça Guanabara: 2011
Taça Rio: 2011
Rio de Janeiro State League: 2011

Contract

References

External links
 saopaulofc.net
 CBF
sambafoot
 ogol.com.br

1986 births
Living people
Brazilian footballers
Brazilian expatriate footballers
Campeonato Brasileiro Série A players
Moldovan Super Liga players
Fluminense FC players
São Paulo FC players
Goiás Esporte Clube players
Associação Portuguesa de Desportos players
CR Flamengo footballers
Grêmio Barueri Futebol players
Esporte Clube Internacional de Lages players
FC Sheriff Tiraspol players
Expatriate footballers in Moldova
Association football midfielders
Footballers from Rio de Janeiro (city)